The Pinacoteca Civica of Forlì, one of the civic museums of Forlì and currently based in the Musei di San Domenico, is an Italian art gallery. Artists whose work the gallery exhibits include:

 Livio Agresti
 Clemente Alberi
 Beato Angelico
 Nicola Bertucci
 Guido Cagnacci - the museum recently acquired (2005) his work "Allegoria dell'Astrologia sferica"
 Antonio Canova
 Baldassarre Carrari
 Giovanni Crivelli
 Domenichino
 Giovanni Fattori
 Guercino
 Lorenzo di Credi
 Carlo Magini
 Girolamo Marchesi
 Melozzo da Forlì(?)
 Francesco Menzocchi
 Livio Modigliani
 Giorgio Morandi
 Marco Palmezzano
 Adolfo Wildt

It contains the Verzocchi collection of 20th-century Italian painting.

Note

External links

Fuller account
Works exhibited

Art museums and galleries in Emilia-Romagna
Buildings and structures in Forlì
Museums in Emilia-Romagna